The 2002 North Carolina Senate election was held on November 5, 2002 as part of the biennial election to the General Assembly.  All fifty seats in the North Carolina Senate were elected.

Results Summary

Incumbents defeated in general election
Allen Wellons (D-District 11), defeated by Fred Smith (R)
T. L. Odom (D-District 34), defeated by Robert Pittenger (R) with district being renumbered as District 40

Open seats that changed parties
Aaron Plyler (D-District 17) did not seek re-election, seat won by Fern Shubert (R) with the district renumbered as District 35
Charles Newell Carter (D-District 28) did not seek re-election, seat won by Tom Apodaca with the district renumbered as District 48
Dan Robinson (D-District 29) lost a redistricting race to Robert C. Carpenter (R-District 42) with the district renumbered as District 50

Newly created seats
District 5, won by Tony Moore (D)
District 6, won by Cecil Hargett (D)
District 14, won by Vernon Malone (D)
District 17, won by Richard Stevens (R)
District 22, won by Harris Blake (R)
District 29, won by Jerry Tillman (R)
District 34, won by Andrew Brock (R)
District 41, won by R. B. Sloan Jr. (R)
District 47, won by Joe Sam Queen (D)

Seats eliminated by redistricting
Luther Jordan (D-District 7) did not seek re-election after his district was merged with the 4th district to form the new 9th district
Ed Warren (D-District 9) did not seek re-election after his district was merged with the 6th district to form the new 9th District
Brad Miller (D-District 14) ran for the U.S House after his multi member district became a single member district (District 16)
Oscar Harris (D-District 15), did not seek reelection after his seat was merged with 11th district to form the new 12th District
Howard Lee (D-District 16) lost re-nomination to Eleanor Kinnaird after his multi-member district became a single member district (District 23)
Robert G. Shaw (R-District 19) lost re-nomination to Phil Berger after his seat was merged with the 12th district to form the new 26th district
Cal Cunningham (D-District 23) did not seek re-election after his district was merged with the 33rd district.
Kenneth R. Moore (R-District 27) lost re-nomination to Virginia Foxx after his seat merged with the 12th district to form the new 45th District

Detailed Results

Districts 1-25

District 1
Incumbent Democratic President Pro Tempore Marc Basnight has represented the 1st district since 1985.

District 2
The new 2nd district overlaps with much of the former 3rd district.  Incumbent Democrat Scott Thomas, who has represented the 3rd district since 2001, was re-elected here.

District 3
The new 3rd district includes the homes of incumbent Democrats Ed N. Warren, who has represented the 9th district since 1991, and R.L. Martin, who has represented the 6th district since 1985. Neither sought re-election here and Democrat Clark Jenkins won the open seat.

District 4
The new 4th district overlaps with much of the former 2nd district. Incumbent Democrat Frank Ballance, who has represented the 2nd district since 1989, ran for the U.S. House.  Democrat Robert L. Holloman won the open seat.

District 5
The new 5th district is based in Wilson and Pitt counties and isn't a safe seat for either party.  Democrat Tony Moore won the open seat.

District 6
The new 6th district is based in Jones and Onslow counties. Democrat Cecil Hargett won the open seat.

District 7
The new 7th district overlaps with much of the former 8th district.  Incumbent Democrat John Kerr, who has represented the 8th district since 1993, was re-elected here.

District 8
The new 8th district overlaps with much of the former 18th district.  Incumbent Democrat R. C. Soles Jr., who has represented the 18th district and its predecessors since 1977, was re-elected here.

District 9
The new 9th district overlaps with much of the former 4th district.  Incumbent Republican Patrick Ballantine, who has represented the 4th district since 1995, was re-elected here.

District 10
The new 10th district overlaps with much of the former 5th district.  Incumbent Democrat Charles Albertson, who has represented the 5th district since 1993, was re-elected here.

District 11
The new 11th district overlaps with much of the former 10th district.  Incumbent Democrat A. B. Swindell, who has represented the 10th district since 2001, was re-elected here.

District 12
The new 12th district includes the homes of incumbent Democrats Allen Wellons, who has represented the 11th district since 1997, and Oscar Harris, who has represented the 15th district since 1999. Wellons ran for re-election here but was defeated by Republican Fred Smith.

District 13
The new 13th district overlaps with much of the former 30th district.  Incumbent Democrat David Weinstein, who has represented the 30th district since 1997, was re-elected here.

District 14
The new 14th district is based in Wake County and has no incumbent. Democrat Vernon Malone won the open seat.

District 15
The new 15th district overlaps with much of the former 36th district.  Incumbent Republican John Carrington, who has represented the 15th district since 1995, was re-elected here.

District 16
The new 16th district overlaps with much of the former 14th district.  Incumbent Democrats Eric Miller Reeves and Brad Miller have represented the 14th district since 1997.  Miller ran for the U.S. House while Reeves was re-elected here.

District 17
The new 17th district is based in Southern Wake County and had no incumbent. Republican Richard Stevens won the open seat.

District 18
The new 18th district overlaps with much of the northern portion of the former 13th district.  Incumbent Democrat Wib Gulley, who has represented the 13th district since 1993, was re-elected here.

District 19
The new 19th district overlaps with much of the former 24th district.  Incumbent Democrat Tony Rand, who has represented the 24th district since 1995, was re-elected here.

District 20
The new 20th district (Based in Durham County) overlaps with much of the southern portion of the old 13th district.  Incumbent Democrat Jeanne Hopkins Lucas, who has represented the 13th district since 1993, was re-elected here.

District 21
The new 21st district overlaps with much of the former 41st district.  Incumbent Democrat Larry Shaw, who has represented the 41st district since 1995, was re-elected here.

District 22
The new 22nd District includes all of Moore and Lee counties, as well as the western portion of Harnett County. Republican Harris Blake won the open seat.

District 23
The new 23rd district overlaps with much of the former 16th district.  Incumbent Democrats Eleanor Kinnaird and Howard Lee have both represented the 16th district since 1997. Kinnaird was re-elected here.

District 24
The new 24th district overlaps with much of the former 21st district.  Incumbent Republican Hugh Webster, who has represented the 21st district since 1995, was re-elected here.

District 25
The new 25th district overlaps with much of the eastern portion of the former 17th district.  Incumbent Democrat Bill Purcell, who has represented the 17th district since 1997, was re-elected here.

Districts 26-50

District 26
The new 26th District includes the homes of incumbent Republicans  Phil Berger, who has represented the 12th district since 2001, and Robert G. Shaw, who has represented the 19th district since 1985. Berger was re-elected here.

District 27
The new 27th district overlaps with much of the former 32nd district. Incumbent Democrat Kay Hagan, who has represented the 32nd district since 1999, was re-elected here.

District 28
The new 28th district overlaps with much of the former 31st district. Incumbent Democrat William N. Martin, who has represented the 31st district since 1983 did not seek re-election. Democrat Katie Dorsett won the open seat.

District 29
The new 29th district includes Randolph and Montgomery counties and had no incumbent. Republican Jerry Tillman won the open seat.

District 30
The new 30th district overlaps with much of the former 27th district. Incumbent Republican John Garwood, who has represented the 27th district since 1997, was re-elected here.

District 31
The new 31st district overlaps with parts of the former 20th district. Incumbent Republican Hamilton C. Horton, Jr., who has represented the 20th district since 1995, was re-elected here.

District 32
the new 32nd district overlaps with parts of the former 20th district. Incumbent Democrat Linda Garrou, who has represented the 20th district since 1999, was re-elected here.

District 33
The new 33rd district includes the homes of incumbent Democrat Cal Cunningham, who has represented the 23rd district since 2001, and incumbent Republican Stan Bingham, who has represented the 38th district since 2001. Cunningham did not seek re-election and Bingham was re-elected here.

District 34
The new 34th district includes all of Davie and Yadkin counties as well as most of Rowan County. Republican Andrew Brock won the open seat.

District 35
The new 35th district overlaps with much of the western portion of the old 17th district. Incumbent Democrat Aaron Plyler, who has represented the 17th district since 1983, did not seek re-election. Republican Fern Shubert won the open seat.

District 36
The new 36th district overlaps with much of the former 22nd district. Incumbent Republican Fletcher L. Hartsell Jr., who has represented the 22nd district since 1991, was re-elected here.

District 37
The new 37th district overlaps with much of the former 40th district. Incumbent Democrat Dan Clodfelter, who has represented the 40th district since 1999, was re-elected here.

District 38
The new 38th district overlaps with much of the former 33rd district. Incumbent Democrat Charlie Dannelly, who has represented the 38th district since 1995, was re-elected here.

District 39
The new 39th district overlaps with much of the former 35th district. Incumbent Republican Bob Rucho, who has represented the 35th district since 1997, was re-elected here.

District 40
The new 40th district overlaps with much of the former 34th district. Incumbent Democrat T. L. Odom, who has represented the 40th district since 1989, lost re-election here to Republican Robert Pittenger.

District 41
The new 41st district includes all of Alexander and Iredell counties and had no incumbent. Republican R. B. Sloan, Jr. won the open seat.

District 42
The new 42nd district overlaps with much of the former 39th district. Incumbent Republican James Forrester, who has represented the 39th district and its predecessors since 1991, was re-elected here.

District 43
The new 43rd district overlaps with much of the former 25th district. Incumbent Democrat David Hoyle, who has represented the 25th district since 1993, was re-elected here.

District 44
The new 44th district overlaps with much of the former 26th district. Incumbent Republican Austin Allran, who has represented the 26th district since 1987, was re-elected here.

District 45
The new 45th District includes the homes of incumbent Republicans Virginia Foxx, who has represented the 12th district since 1995, and Kenneth R. Moore, who has represented the 27th district since 1997. Foxx was re-elected here.

District 46
The new 46th district overlaps with much of the former 37th district. Incumbent Democrat Walter Dalton, who has represented the 37th district since 1997, was re-elected here.

District 47
The new 47th district includes all of Avery, Mitchell, McDowell, Yancey, and Madison counties as well as most of Haywood County. The district had no incumbent and Democrat Joe Sam Queen won the open seat.

District 48
The new 48th District includes all of Henderson and Polk counties as well as southwestern Buncombe County. The District includes the home of Incumbent Democrat Charles Newell Carter, who has represented the 28th district since 1999. Carter did not seek re-election and Republican Tom Apodaca won the open seat.

District 49
The new 49th district overlaps with much of the western portion of the old 28th district. Incumbent Democrat Steve Metcalf, who has represented the 28th district since 1999, was re-elected here.

District 50
The new 50th district includes the homes of Incumbent Democrat Dan Robinson, who has represented the 29th district since 1999, and Incumbent Republican Robert C. Carpenter, who has represented the 42nd district since 1989. Carpenter defeated Robinson to win another term in the Senate.

2002
2002 state legislature elections in the United States
2002 North Carolina elections